Lousy with Love (The B-Sides) is a compilation album by Scottish alternative rock band Del Amitri, released in September 1998. It is a collection of B-sides released between 1989 and 1998, featuring tracks not included on Del Amitri's studio albums. It was released in parallel with the best of album Hatful of Rain.

Track listing

Note
Tracks 14–97 each consist of 13 seconds of silence; track 98 is unlisted.

Personnel
Del Amitri (1989-1998)
Justin Currie – vocals, bass
Iain Harvie – guitar
Mick Slaven – guitar 
David Cummings – guitar 
Jon McLoughlin – guitar
Kris Dollimore – guitar
Andy Alston – keyboards 
Paul Tyagi – drums 
Brian McDermott – drums 
Chris Sharrock – drums 
Ash Soan – drums
Mark Price – drums 
Technical
Credits adapted from the album liner notes, except where noted.

The Groovey Tubes – producer (1, 3, 5-13, 98)
David Kershenbaum – producer (2)
Mark Freegard – producer (4, 6)
Al Clay – producer (9, 10), mixing (3, 10, 12)
Kenny Patterson – engineer (1, 5, 7, 8, 11, 98)
Kenny MacDonald – engineer (13)
David Bianco – mixing (4, 6)
Julian Mendelsohn – mixing (2)

External links
Official Del Amitri homepage

References 

Del Amitri albums
1998 albums
B-side compilation albums
A&M Records compilation albums